Austromusotima metastictalis is a moth of the family Crambidae. It is found in New Guinea and possibly also in northern Queensland in Australia.

The length of the forewings is 7.8–8.4 mm. The ground color of the forewings is white. In males, the marginal line is orange or yellow and the submarginal line grayish brown. The ground color of the females is brownish yellow or brownish white with a wing pattern similar to the males. Adults are on wing throughout the year, usually peaking after the wet season.

References

Moths described in 1917
Musotiminae